Târnova may refer to several places in Romania:
 Târnova, Arad, a commune
 Târnova, Caraş-Severin, a commune

Tîrnova may refer to these place in Moldova:
 Tîrnova, Donduşeni, a commune in Donduşeni district
 Tîrnova, Edineţ, a commune in Edineţ District

See also 
 Târnava (disambiguation)
 Tarnovo